Grant David McCracken (born 1951) is a Canadian anthropologist and author, known for his books about culture and commerce.  He was the founder and director of the Institute for Contemporary Culture at the Royal Ontario Museum and was a member of Convergence Culture Consortium at MIT. He holds a Ph.D. in anthropology from the University of Chicago.  He coined the term the Diderot effect. He lives in Rowayton, Connecticut.

Bibliography
 1988 The Long Interview
 1990 Culture and Consumption 
 1996 Big Hair 
 1997 Plenitude
 2005 Culture and Consumption II 
 2006 Flock and Flow 
 2008 Transformations 
 2009 Chief Culture Officer
 2012 Culturematic
 2016 Dark Value
 2020 The New Honor Code
 2022 Return of the Artisan

See also 
Diderot effect

References

External links 
 Culture By Grant McCracken's blog
 Audio interview on Chief Culture Officer
 Audio Interview on Culturematic Harvard Business Review
__notoc__

Canadian bloggers
1951 births
Living people
University of Chicago alumni
Harvard Business School faculty